is a former Japanese football player.

Club career
Ono was born in Saitama Prefecture on May 12, 1978. After graduating from high school, he joined Kashiwa Reysol in 1997. He played many matches as offensive midfielder from 1998. At 1999 J.League Cup, he scored a goal at Final and the club won the champions. The club also won the 3rd place 1999 and 2000 J1 League. However his opportunity to play decreased in 2003, he moved to Kyoto Purple Sanga in June 2003 and Nagoya Grampus Eight in 2004. In September 2004, he returned to Kashiwa Reysol club results is bad. However the club was relegated to J2 League end of 2005 season. He moved to J2 League club Tokyo Verdy in 2006 and became a captain of the club. The club won the 2nd place in 2007 and was promoted to J1 League. However his opportunity to play decreased in 2008 and he retired end of 2008 season.

National team career
In June 1997, Ono was selected Japan U-20 national team for 1997 World Youth Championship. At this tournament, he played all 5 matches as offensive midfielder and scored 2 goals against Costa Rica.

Club statistics

References

External links

1978 births
Living people
Association football people from Saitama Prefecture
Japanese footballers
Japan youth international footballers
J1 League players
J2 League players
Kashiwa Reysol players
Kyoto Sanga FC players
Nagoya Grampus players
Tokyo Verdy players
Association football midfielders